The medial tarsal arteries are two or three small branches which ramify on the medial border of the foot and join the medial malleolar network.

References

External links
 http://www.dartmouth.edu/~humananatomy/figures/chapter_17/17-3.HTM

Arteries of the lower limb